Piada may refer to:

 Piadina, an Italian flatbread 
 Piada Italian Street Food, an Ohio restaurant chain
 Piada (moth), a synonym of the moth genus Anuga in the family Euteliidae